North Sydmonton is a small village in the Basingstoke and Deane district of Hampshire, England.

Governance
The village of North Sydmonton is part of the civil parish of Ecchinswell, Sydmonton and Bishops Green and is part of the Burghclere, Highclere and St Mary Bourne ward of Basingstoke and Deane borough council. The borough council is a Non-metropolitan district of Hampshire County Council.

References

Villages in Hampshire